Boyan Radev (born February 25, 1942, in Moshino, Pernik) is a former Greco Roman wrestler from Bulgaria. He was the first Bulgarian two-time Olympic Games champion (1964 Tokyo and 1968 Mexico) and one-time world champion. Radev is also an art collector and artist sponsor.

Professional Wrestling
Boyan Radev wrestled for Minyor Pernik, Orlin Pirdop, CSKA Sofia and Spartak Sofia.

Radev is a two-time Olympic gold medalist (1964 and 1968) and a 1966 world champion.  He has also silver medals at the 1962 and 1967 World Cups as well as the 1968 European Championships.

Awards
Radev has been awarded Bulgarian Sportsperson of the Year in 1964, 1967, and 1968.  He has been given the title Merited Master of Sport of Bulgaria.

Inducted in the United World Wrestling Greco-Roman Hall of Fame in 2009

Awarded Pierre de Coubertin medal in 2009.

Elected Levski Sofia Sportsman of 20th Century.

Ministry of Internal Affairs and Committee for State Security
Radev ended his wrestling career shortly after the merger of Spartak Sofia and Levski Sofia in 1971. Thereafter, he worked for the Ministry of Internal Affairs in Bulgaria.  He  also worked for the Bulgarian Committee for State Security  from 1964 onwards.  Radev was a colonel at the time of his retirement.

Art Collection
As Radev said himself, he became a vivid art collector after he was given a painting by the artist Stoyan Illiev.  Since then, Radev has devoted part of his time to art collecting and  philanthropy in Bulgaria. Radev has donated all of his wrestling medals as well as his Madara (Bulgarian State Order) and Peter the Great (Russian State Order) to the National Historical Museum (Bulgaria) – making him the number one donor to the museum.

References

External links
 

1942 births
Living people
Olympic wrestlers of Bulgaria
Wrestlers at the 1964 Summer Olympics
Wrestlers at the 1968 Summer Olympics
Bulgarian male sport wrestlers
Olympic gold medalists for Bulgaria
People from Pernik
20th-century art collectors
Olympic medalists in wrestling
World Wrestling Championships medalists
Medalists at the 1964 Summer Olympics
European Wrestling Championships medalists